Badema (born 1965) is a Chinese actress and singer of Mongolian ethnicity best known for her role in Norjmaa, which earned her a Best Actress Award in the 30th Golden Rooster Awards.

Biography
Badema was born in Ejin Banner, Alxa League, Inner Mongolia in 1965, to a family of singers. She attended literary and artistic activities since she was a teenager, and she is good at traditional Mongolian folk long song. In 1989 she graduated from Central Conservatory of Music, majoring in vocal music.

Career
Badema's first leading role came with Ulrike Ottinger's 1989 West German drama film Joan of Arc of Mongolia, alongside Irm Hermann and Peter Kern. The movie was entered into the 39th Berlin International Film Festival. In 2017 it screened for a week at the Museum of Modern Art. The movie talks about "a group of cosmopolitan women passengers aboard the Trans-Siberian/Mongolian Railway," who are taken captive by the warrior princess Ulan Iga.

In 2013 she played Pagma in Nikita Mikhalkov's 1991 movie Urga (released in north America as Close to Eden). The movie was well received, and won the Golden Lion at the Venice Film Festival and Best European Film at the European Film Awards. It was also nominated for an Academy Award for Best Foreign Film, and for a Golden Globe in the same category. The movie tells about Gombo, his wife (Badema), and their family, and of their friendship with stranded Russian truck driver Sergei.

In 1997 she was in Wei Lu's Journey to Western Xia Empire, and in 2005 she played Bilike's mother in Ning Hao's Mongolian Ping Pong. In 2008 she played the title role in Bayin's Last Princess of Royal Blood: Tsetsenhangru.

Her greatest achievement so far came with the movie Norjmaa, also directed by Bayin, where she plays the title role. Badema won Best Actress Award at the 33rd Fajr International Film Festival, and the movie won the Best Film Award at the same awards. Badema won Best Actress at the Yakutsk International Film Festival, and Best Actress at the 30th Golden Rooster Awards.

Personal life
Badema was married to Bayin, who is also a notable actor and director in China.

Filmography

Film

Awards

References

External links 
 

1965 births
People from Alxa League
Living people
Central Conservatory of Music alumni
Actresses from Inner Mongolia
Chinese film actresses
Chinese people of Mongolian descent
20th-century Chinese women singers
21st-century Chinese women singers